The 2000 Hyderabad floods were a series of floods that caused extensive damage and loss of life as a result of flash flooding in Hyderabad, India in 2000. Begumpet was the most impacted after a deluge of 241.5 mm was recorded on 24 August 2000.

Aftermath
In cooperation with Geological Survey of India (GSI) the then Andhra Pradesh state government formed Kirloskar committee. According to the committee findings; a 390 km of drain area was illegally occupied by 13,500 structures due to which urban flooding occurs.

See also 

 2020 Hyderabad floods
 Great Musi Flood of 1908

References 

2020 floods
2000 floods in Asia